Glyphipterix acronoma is a species of sedge moth in the genus Glyphipterix. It is endemic to New Zealand and is found in the North and South Islands. It's preferred habitat is open fields on mountain sides and adults are on the wing in December and January.

Taxonomy 
This species was first described in 1888 by Edward Meyrick under the name Glyphipteryx acronoma.  Meyrick used two specimens collected in January at approximately 4000 ft up Mount Arthur to describe the species. George Hudson also used this name when describing and illustrating this species in 1928. In 1986 the genus Glyphipteryx was judged an unjustified emendation of Glyphipterix Hübner so this species is now known as Glyphipterix acronoma.

The lectotype specimen is held at the Natural History Museum, London.

Description 

Meyrick described this species as follows: 
Alfred Philpott studied the maxillae parts of lepidoptera including this species and stated that the genus to which this species belongs had palp that were three or four segmented and were smaller than other genera studied.

Distribution 
G. acronoma is endemic to New Zealand.

Lifecycle and behaviour 

This species is on the wing in December and January.

Habitat 
The preferred habitat of this species is open fields on mountain sides.

References

Moths described in 1888
Glyphipterigidae
Moths of New Zealand
Taxa named by Edward Meyrick
Endemic fauna of New Zealand
Endemic moths of New Zealand